The equestrian statue of the Viscount Wolseley is an outdoor sculpture depicting Garnet Wolseley, 1st Viscount Wolseley, located at the Horse Guards Parade in London, United Kingdom. It is by Sir William Goscombe John and was unveiled by the Duke of Connaught  in 1920. The front of the plinth contains an inscription which reads "Wolseley", while the back includes the inscription: "Field-Marshal Viscount Wolseley, KP, GCB, OM, GCMG, 1833–1913, Commander-in-Chief of the British Army, 1895–1900. / Burmah 1852–3 / Crimea 1854–5 / Indian Mutiny 1857–9 / China 1860–1 / Red River 1870 / Ashanti 1873–4 / South Africa 1879 / Egypt 1882 / Soudan 1884–5."

See also

 1920 in art

References

External links
 
 Pathe newsreel of the unveiling
 Viscount Wolseley – Horse Guards Parade, London, UK at Waymarking.com

1920 establishments in the United Kingdom
1920 sculptures
Equestrian statues in the United Kingdom
Wolseley
Grade II listed monuments and memorials
Monuments and memorials in London
Outdoor sculptures in London
Wolseley
Statues of military officers
Whitehall